The Great Serpent Mound is a 1,348-foot-long (411 m), three-foot-high prehistoric effigy mound located in Peebles, Ohio. It was built on what is known as the Serpent Mound crater plateau, running along the Ohio Brush Creek in Adams County, Ohio. The mound is the largest serpent effigy in the world.

The first published surveys of the mound were by Ephraim G. Squier and Edwin Hamilton Davis, featured in their historic volume, Ancient Monuments of the Mississippi Valley (1848), commissioned by the Smithsonian Institution.

The United States Department of Interior designated the mound as a National Historic Landmark in 1966. The mound is maintained through the Ohio History Connection, a non-profit organization dedicated to preserving historical sites throughout Ohio.

Description 

Effigy mounds have been constructed independently by several cultures. The significance of The Serpent Mound is based on its size and historical relevance. Made up of three parts, The Serpent Mound extends over 1,376 feet (419 m) in length, varying from 9" to over 3' (30–100 cm) in height. The mound stands with a width varying between 20 and 25 feet based on the section. The Serpent Mound conforms to the surrounding land, as it was built on the bluff above the Ohio Brush Creek. The mound winds back and forth for more than eight hundred feet, with its tail coiling in seven areas throughout the mound.  The mound features a triple-coiled tail at the end of the structure, often viewed as a benchmark of the mound. Yellowish clay and ash make up the main constituents of the mound, with a layer of rocks and soil reinforcing the outer layer. The open-mouth head of the serpent nearly engulfs a hollow oval feature that faces the east and is 120-foot (37 m)-long. 

This feature represents an egg, with an apparent depiction of the snake consuming it. Many scholars believe that the oval is a representation of the Sun, or the body of a frog. Others think it is the remnant of a platform mound. The western side of the effigy features a triangular mound approximately 31.6 feet (9.6 m) at its base and long axis, reminiscent of other existing serpent effigies in Canada and Scotland.

Origin and chronology 
Throughout the twentieth century, archaeologists had disputed which culture and people had created the Serpent Mound, as can be seen in a overview published by the Metropolitan Museum of Art in 2002. 
The Ancient Earthworks Project published "New Radiocarbon Dates Suggest Serpent Mound is More Than 2,000 Years Old" (July 2014). This provided evidence supporting attribution of the mound to the Adena peoples around 300 BCE (2300 years ago). The article refers to radiocarbon data, which was published later in an October 2014 article in The Journal of Archaeological Science.  These scholars also conclude that the mound was renovated around 1400 CE by Fort Ancient peoples.
In 2019, Monaghan and Hermann published additional research in an article in The Midcontinental Journal of Archaeology that supports their earlier conclusions.  They corroborated the 2014 research, and refined the radiocarbon dates. Monaghan and Hermann determined that the mound was built around 2,100–2,300 years ago (300-100 BCE) during the Adena period. It was subsequently rebuilt (or repaired) about 900 years ago (1100 CE) during the Fort Ancient period.

In 2018 archaeologist Brad Lepper published a response questioning the attribution of construction to the Adena culture.
Lepper et al. pointed out that the dates obtained by Herrmann and Romain are of poor quality. The material the team dated is not charcoal, but “organic sediment” (Herrman et al 2014:119). Moreover, the samples were obtained from soil cores and not an exposed stratigraphic profile, so the resulting dates are known to be problematic. Henriksen et al (2019) have demonstrated that such dates can be as much as 3,000 years older than the actual age of a mound. Moreover, the Adena culture is not known to have built effigy mounds or to have used serpent symbolism in their art, whereas the Fort Ancient built Ohio’s Alligator Mound and frequently depicted serpents in their art. Therefore, the best available data indicate that Serpent Mound was built by the Fort Ancient culture.
The Serpent Mound at Rice Lake in Peterborough County, Ontario, Canada, has been dated to more than 2,000 years old. It has also been linked to the Adena culture.  It is a Middle Woodland Hopewell burial mound in a zigzag share that may or may not have been intended to depict a serpent (Oberholtzer 2013:163).

Prehistory of Ohio 

Several groups of Paleo-Indians (13000 BCE–7000 BCE) occupied the land in Ohio prior to the development of the Adena and Hopewell cultures. Evidence shows that numerous groups of Paleo-Indians occupied the land in Ohio and ranged throughout the territory. They were hunter-gatherers who traveled seasonally for game. The Paleo-Indians hunted large game such as mastodon. Archaeologists have found remains of more 150 mastodons in Ohio,  as well as the remains of other large game. The most complete mastodon skeleton was excavated at the Burning Tree Mastodon site.

Clovis point spear heads have been found that indicate interaction with other groups of Paleo-Indians who also hunted large game.

The Paleo Crossing site and Nobles Pond site tools, such as spear-throwers, were more sophisticated. Base camps were established for winter lodging. The Glacial Kame culture, a late Archaic group, traded for sea shell and copper with other groups. These materials were used for objects that were a sign of prestige within the group, carried by respected healers and hunters. The objects were buried with their owners.

Following the ancient Paleo-Indians, the Woodland Period (800 BCE–1200 CE) of the Post-Archaic Period is known for its rich ritual and artistic life and well-developed villages. The Woodland Period is well known as a period in which cultures built earthworks and mounds. They are believed to have been related to religious practices as some mounds were used for burials. Along with hunting and gathering, cultures of this period (usually the women) began to cultivate crops such as maize, squash and beans. The Adena and Hopewell cultures flourished during the Early and Middle Woodland periods, and the addition of crops enabled the population of the Woodland people to expand dramatically. Several groups of the Woodland people lived in larger villages, surrounded by defensive walls or ditches. Ceremonial and artistic endeavors waned during the Late Woodland period, as well as trading with other groups. Many of the earthworks and effigy mounds were built early in this period. Later the cultures did not build new mounds.

During the late prehistoric period (900 CE–1650 CE), the villages of such cultures as the Adena and the Fort Ancient peoples were much larger. These villages were often built on a higher ground near a river, commonly surrounded by a wooden stockade. After a long hiatus, some cultures had begun to build earthworks and effigy mounds, but not as frequently as during the Woodland period.

Cultures of the Midwest

Adena culture 

The Adena culture consisted of the pre-contact Native Americans who lived throughout the midwest in the areas that would become the states of Kentucky, Indiana, Pennsylvania, West Virginia and, most predominantly, Ohio. The majority of these peoples inhabited the Scioto River and Hocking valleys in southern Ohio, as well as the Kanawha Valley near present-day Charleston, West Virginia. This period is often referred to as The Early Woodland Period, ranging between 800 BCE and 1 CE. The name “Adena” refers to the culture of the peoples rather than to a singular group or tribe. 

Researchers adopted the name "Adena" from the Ross County estate of Ohio Governor Thomas Worthington, about one and a half miles northwest of Chillicothe, Ohio. Worthington referred to the community as “Adena”,which Worthington’s diary claims comes from a Hebrew name that “was given to places for the delightfulness of their situations.”  An ancient burial mound, standing 26 feet tall, had been located at the estate and was known as "The Adena Mound". It was destroyed for agricultural development.  

Archaeologists attribute the mounds to the Adena culture as a whole, though are unsure of the specific tribes that inhabited the land. The term "culture" encompasses similarities in artifact style, architecture, and other cultural practices, allowing archaeologists to distinguish the Adena culture from other cultures in the region at different time periods. The Adena Mound site became the "type site" of the regional culture. 

Like other peoples of the Woodland period, the Adena culture were hunter-gatherers. The women also  domesticated and cultivated various crops such as squash, sunflower, sumpweed, goosefoot, knotweed, maygrass, and tobacco. They often lived in small villages with surrounding gardens but moved frequently to follow various animal herds while planting and feeding on various types of nuts, fruits and roots along the way. The Adena people are also known for their production of clay pottery, having been one of the first to cultures to bring it to Ohio. Observed through remains found at the type site, archaeologists characterize the Adena's clay pottery through its large, thick-walled vessels, resembling a modern-day bowl. Archaeologists believe that this clay pottery was used to cook ground seeds into an oatmeal-like substance.

The Adena were known for their burial practices, having buried their dead in prominent mounds throughout the midwest. Many archaeologists believe that these structures served as territorial markers for the Adena people. The mounds themselves were often accompanied by small circular earthen enclosures that many archaeologists believe were once used for rituals. The Miamisburg Mound in Montgomery County, Ohio, is home to the largest Adena burial mound in the state. Mounds such as this hosted multiple burials, characterized by the rituals performed and the funerary objects worn such as bracelets, ear spools, gorgets and other ornaments. Larger ornaments such as bones and stone tools were often worn around the neck. The deceased individual was either cremated or placed on their back in timber-lined tombs.

By 1 CE, the Adena culture began to decline and their civilizations began to evolve into what is known as The Hopewell culture. Numerous Adena groups began to build larger earthworks and effigy mounds, expanding their efforts to acquire exotic raw materials such as copper and mica. Many people of The Hopewell culture continued to follow the old ways of the Adena people. In some regions, including Southwestern Ohio, the Adena way of life persisted well into the first century CE through the efforts of these people.

The Fort Ancient Culture 

The Fort Ancient Culture refers to the Native American Cultures that flourished from 1000 CE to 1750 CE, predominantly inhabiting land near the Ohio River valley. These civilizations flourished in the modern-day regions of southern Ohio, northern Kentucky, southeastern Indiana and western West Virginia. The Fort Ancient tribes are often referred to as a "sister culture" of the Mississippian culture, though can be distinguished through the time period in which they thrived and their many cultural differences. Along with their relation to the Mississippian culture, evidence suggests that the Fort Ancient Culture were not the direct descendants of the Hopewellian Culture. Despite what many believe, the tribes of the Fort Ancient Culture were not responsible for the creation of The Great Serpent Mound, though contributed to its physical appearance through maintenance around 200 CE

The name of the culture originates from the Fort Ancient archeological site. However, the Fort Ancient Site is now thought to have been built by Ohio Hopewellian people, having later been occupied later by the succeeding Fort Ancient culture. The site is located on a hill above the Little Miami River, close to Lebanon, Ohio. Despite its name, most archaeologists do not believe that Fort Ancient was used primarily as a fortress by either the Ohio Hopewell culture or the Fort Ancient Culture. Archaeologists believe that it was more likely used as a ceremonial location.

In 1996, the team of Robert V. Fletcher and Terry L. Cameron (under the supervision of the Ohio Historical Society's Bradley T. Lepper) reopened a trench created by Frederic Ward Putnam of Harvard over 100 years before. They found a few pieces of charcoal in what was believed to be an undisturbed portion of the Serpent Mound. However, bioturbation, including burrows, frost cracks, etc., can reverse the structural timeline of an earthen mound such as Serpent Mound. It can shift carbon left by a later culture on the surface to areas deep within the structure, making the earthwork appear younger.

When the team conducted carbon dating studies on the charcoal pieces, two yielded a date of ca. 1070 CE, with the third piece dating to the Late Archaic period some two thousand years earlier, specifically 2920+/-65 years BP (before the present). The third date, ca. 2900 BP, was recovered from a core sample below cultural modification level. The first two dates place the Serpent Mound within the realm of the Fort Ancient culture. The third dates the mound back to very early Adena culture or before.

The Fort Ancient people contributed to maintaining and refurbishing The Great Serpent Mound though were not responsible for its creation. The rattlesnake is significant as a symbol in the Mississippian culture, helping us to understand the significance of the mound's shape. When attempting to identify the species of snake, there is no sign or indication of a rattle.

Very few, if any, artifacts from The Fort Ancient people can be found at the site of The Great Serpent Mound. As just like the Adena people, the Fort Ancient Culture often buried artifacts in its mounds. Along with a lack of artifacts found, the Fort Ancient people were not known to bury their dead in the same manner as the Adena culture, especially in proximity to the effigy.

Another effigy mound found in Ohio, the Alligator Effigy Mound in Granville, was carbon dated to the Fort Ancient period.

Meaning of the mound 

Having been built around 1070 CE, many archaeologists believe that the mound's creation could have been influenced by two different astronomical events: the light from the supernova that created the Crab Nebula in the year 1054 CE and the appearance of Halley's Comet in 1066 CE The light of the supernova would have been visible for two weeks after it first reached earth, which could even be seen in broad day light. As a secondary theory, archaeologists assumed that the tail of Halley's Comet could have influenced the shape of the mound, though the tail of the comet has always appeared as a long, straight line that does not resemble the curves of the Serpent Mound. Numerous other supernovas may have occurred over the centuries that span the possible construction dates of the effigy, though these two influences remain the most prominent theories.

The mound is located on the site of a classic astrobleme, an ancient meteorite impact structure. When attempting to understand the impact origin of this structure, the pattern of disruption of sedimentary strata has provided archaeologists with a lot of information. In the center of the structure, strata have been uplifted several hundred feet, resembling the central uplifts of the Copernicus lunar crater. In 2003 geologists from Ohio State University and the University of Glasgow (Scotland) corroborated the meteorite impact origin of the structure at The Serpent Mound. They had previously studied core samples collected at the site in the 1970s, providing them with a background of information pertaining to the site. Further analyses of the rock core samples indicated that the impact occurred during the Permian Period, about 248 to 286 million years ago. This has led archaeologists to believe that the topographic expression of this impact or the impact crater, has been completely erased by erosion.

In 1987, Clark and Marjorie Hardman published their finding that the oval-to-head area of the serpent is aligned to the summer solstice sunset. A depiction of the serpent mound appeared in The Century periodical in April 1890, drawn by William Jacob Baer.

According to archaeologist Brad Lepper, Serpent Mound may be a depiction of a Dhegihan Siouan origin story of the Great Serpent "Toothy Mouth”, lord of the Beneath World, who impregnated the First Woman

Preservation 

Ancient Monuments of the Mississippi Valley fascinated many across the country, including Frederic Ward Putnam of the Peabody Museum of Archaeology and Ethnology at Harvard University. Putnam spent much of his career lecturing and publishing on the Ohio mounds, specifically the Serpent Mound. When he visited the Midwest in 1885, he found that plowing and development were destroying many of the mounds, removing significant history of these cultures and their burial sites. In 1886, with help from a group of wealthy women in Boston, such as The Glass Flowers' patroness Mary Lee Ware, Putnam raised funds to purchase 60 acres (240,000 m2) at the site of The Serpent Mound in hopes to ensure its preservation. Along with The Serpent Mound, the purchase also contained three conical mounds as well as a village site and burial place. The Serpent Mound is now listed as a "Great Wonder of the Ancient World" by National Geographic Magazine.

The mound was originally purchased on behalf of the Trustees of the Peabody Museum. In 1900, the land and its ownership were granted to the Ohio State Archaeological and Historical Society (a predecessor of the present Ohio Historical Society). The Ohio Historical Society has designated the Arc of Appalachia Preserves system, a project of Highlands Sanctuary, Inc., as the managing agency of Serpent Mound from 2010 until March 2021. In March 2021, The Ohio History Connection took back active management of the site. Following an instance of vandalism in 2015, more security cameras and protective gates were added to ensure the protection of the site and surrounding area.

Excavation 
During excavation of The Serpent Mound archaeologists uncovered pipes, points, and earspool from the Hopewell culture as well as Gorgets and points from the Adena culture.

After raising sufficient funds, Putnam returned to the same site in 1886. He worked for four years to excavate the burial sequence contents of both The Serpent Mound and two nearby conical mounds. After completing his excavation and publishing his work, Putnam worked on restoring the mounds to their original state.

One of the conical mounds that was excavated by Putnam in 1890 yielded several artifacts of a principal burial hosted by during the period of the Adena people. Along with these findings, Putnam found and excavated nine intrusive burials in the mound through his discovery of an ash bed containing many prehistoric artifacts, north of the conical mound. After the excavation, the conical mound was reconstructed and currently stands just north of the parking lot at The Serpent Mound State Memorial.

In 2011, archaeologists took the opportunity to excavate the property prior to installation of utility lines at The Serpent Mound State Memorial. The excavations focused on three sides of the conical mound which had previously been excavated by Putnam in 1890. In addition to these concentrations of artifacts, an ashy soil horizon was excavated north of the conical mound, where archaeologists were able to uncover many prehistoric artifacts. It is believed that the ashy deposit of charcoal is the remainder of a Fort Ancient Culture ash bed. The wood charcoal from within the remnant bed was carbon dated back to the time of the Fort Ancient Culture, between the years of 1041 CE and 1211 CE Given the results found through carbon dating, burials in the conical mound dated to the Early Woodland and Fort Ancient periods, suggestive of ritual reuse of the circum mound area and ash bed.

Serpent Mound Museum 

In 1901, the Ohio Historical Society hired engineer, Clinton Cowan, to survey newly acquired lands. Cowan created a 56 by 72-inch (1,800 mm) map that depicted the outline of The Serpent Mound in relation to nearby landmarks, such as hills and rivers. Along with this, Cowan made specific geographical surveys of the area, discovering a unique astrobleme on which the mound is based. He found that the mound is at the convergence of three distinctly different soil types. Cowan's information, in conjunction with Putnam's archaeological discoveries, has been the basis for all modern investigations of The Serpent Mound. Furthermore, a digital GIS map of Ohio's Great Serpent Mound was created by Timothy A. Price and Nichole I. Stump in March 2002.

In 1967, The Ohio Historical Society opened The Serpent Mound Museum, built very close to the site of the mound. A pathway was constructed around the base of the mound, guiding visitors through and around the site. The museum features exhibits that include explanations of the effigy's form, description of the constructing of the mound and the geographical history of the area. The museum also features an exhibit on the Adena culture, which they historically credited as the creators of the mound.

Serpent Mound State Memorial is currently being operated on behalf of the Ohio Historical Society by the Arc of Appalachia Preserve System. It is a non-profit organization that specializes in the preservation and protection of native biodiversity and prehistoric aboriginal sites in southern Ohio.

See also 
 Cahokia
 Crooks Mound
 Glades culture
 Indian Mounds Park
 Mound Builders
 Nazca Lines
 Spiro Mounds
 Marree Man
 List of impact craters on Earth
 List of impact craters in North America

References

Further reading 
 Fletcher, Robert V., Terry L. Cameron, Bradley T. Lepper, Dee Anne Wymer, and William Pickard, "Serpent Mound: A Fort Ancient Icon?", Midcontinental Journal of Archaeology, Vol 21, No. 1, Spring 1996, University of Iowa.
Putnam, Frederic Ward, "The Serpent Mound of Ohio: Site Excavation and Park Reconstruction.", Century Magazine Vol 39: 871–888. Illustrations by William Jacob Baer.
 Squier, Ephraim G. and Edwin H. Davis, Ancient Monuments of the Mississippi Valley, Smithsonian Institution Press, Washington D.C., 1998. Reprint of 1848 edition with a new introduction by David J. Meltzer.
Weintraub, Daniel and Kevin R. Schwarz, "Long Shadows Over the Valley: Recent Findings from ASC Group's Excavations at Serpent Mound State Memorial", Current Research in Ohio Archaeology 2013. The Ohio Archaeological Council.
 Woodward, Susan L. and Jerry N. McDonald, Indian Mounds of the Middle Ohio Valley, Blacksburg, Virginia: The McDonald & Woodward Publishing Company, 1986

External links 

 Serpent Mound, Ohio Historical Society
 Arc of Appalachia: Serpent Mound
 "Hopewell culture National Historical Park", National Park Service
 Ohio History Teachers – Field Trips: Serpent Mound
 "Archaeological Sites: Serpent Mound", Minnesota State University Mankato
 Ohio State Archaeological and Historical Society
 Scientists try to unlock Serpent Mound secrets

Fort Ancient culture
Archaeological sites on the National Register of Historic Places in Ohio
Archaeological sites in Ohio
Pre-statehood history of Ohio
Museums in Adams County, Ohio
National Register of Historic Places in Adams County, Ohio
National Historic Landmarks in Ohio
Archaeological museums in Ohio
Ohio History Connection
History museums in Ohio
Snakes
Protected areas of Adams County, Ohio
Parks in Ohio
Geoglyphs
Mounds in Ohio
World Heritage Tentative List